Kurgal (also Romanized as Kūrgal) is a village in Qomrud Rural District, in the Central District of Qom County, Qom Province, Iran. At the 2006 census, its population was 76, in 16 families.

References 

Populated places in Qom Province